Ramose was an ancient Egyptian prince of the Eighteenth Dynasty; probably the son of Pharaoh Ahmose I.

He is depicted in the 20th Dynasty tomb of Inherkhau (TT359) among the "Lords of the West" with several of his family members and a few important pharaohs (among the depicted are (Amenhotep I, Ahmose I, Ahhotep, Ahmose Meritamon, Ahmose Sitamun, Siamun, Ahmose Henuttamehu, Ahmose Tumerisy, Ahmose Nebetta, Ahmose Sipair, Ahmose Nefertari, Ramesses I, Mentuhotep II, Amenhotep II, Seqenenre Tao II, Ramesses IV, Thutmose I). A statue of his is owned by the University of Liverpool.

Sources

Princes of the Eighteenth Dynasty of Egypt
Children of Ahmose I